Anders Frostenson (23 April 1906 in Loshult, Sweden – 4 April 2006) was a Swedish hymnwriter, priest, and writer. He was a paternal uncle of Katarina Frostenson.

1906 births
2006 deaths
Swedish Lutheran hymnwriters
20th-century Swedish Lutheran priests
Swedish male writers
Swedish-language writers